Clem–Kagey Farm, also known as the Hiram C. Clem House and Kagey House, is a historic home and farm located near Edinburg, Shenandoah County, Virginia. The farmhouse was built in 1880, and is a two-story, five bay, frame I-house dwelling with an integral rear wing. It features a full width, two-story Italianate style ornamented front porch and two brick interior chimneys. Also on the property are the contributing frame garage (c. 1920, the two-story frame wagon shed/shop building (c. 1880), and granary (c. 1880).

It was listed on the National Register of Historic Places in 2009.

References

Houses on the National Register of Historic Places in Virginia
Farms on the National Register of Historic Places in Virginia
Italianate architecture in Virginia
Houses completed in 1880
Houses in Shenandoah County, Virginia
National Register of Historic Places in Shenandoah County, Virginia